Sanjay Gupta MD (previously House Call With Dr. Sanjay Gupta) is a medical-centric news program hosted by CNN's in-house physician, Sanjay Gupta.  The 30 minute program aired Saturdays at 4:30 pm ET in 2013 and 2014.

References

CNN original programming
English-language television shows
2010s American medical television series
2013 American television series debuts